Gruffudd ab Adda (fl. mid 14th century) was a Welsh language poet and musician.  Gruffudd was a contemporary of Dafydd ap Gwilym, whose death he mourned in elegy.

See also

 Gruffudd ab Adda at Wikisource

Welsh-language poets
14th-century Welsh poets